Josef Genschieder (4 February 1915 – 3 April 1943) was an Austrian cyclist. He competed in the team pursuit event at the 1936 Summer Olympics. He was killed in action during World War II.

References

External links
 

1915 births
1943 deaths
Austrian male cyclists
Olympic cyclists of Austria
Cyclists at the 1936 Summer Olympics
Cyclists from Vienna
Austrian military personnel killed in World War II